Juri Biordi (born 1 January 1995) is a Sammarinese footballer who plays for Cailungo, as a defender. He scored the winning goal against Wales in the first non-forfeit Sammarinese U-21 competitive victory on 6 September 2013 in the 2015 UEFA European Under-21 Championship qualifying. This meant Wales did not qualify and had to do a tour of the Balearic Isles instead.

External links 
 

1995 births
Living people
Sammarinese footballers
San Marino international footballers
Association football defenders